Celtro Communication (2012) LTD. is a communications technologies vendor for mobile Backhaul (telecommunications) compression and optimization solutions headquartered in Petah Tikva Israel with additional offices in Russia, Africa and India. Since its founding in 2003, Celtro commercially deployed its line of products in over 80 cellular operators worldwide, directly as well as through associates distributors and re-sellers.

History
In 2001, ECI Telecom, headquartered in Petah Tikva Israel, establish Celtro as an independent business unit within NGTS division with Eli Bortman (CEO), targeted to developed cellular network backhauling optimization technology. In October 2003, Momentum Venture Management (founded in early 2002) lead with other investors the spun off ECI's mobile optimization group and founded Celtro Ltd.

Since the formation of Celtro, Roni Tzur held the office as the company Chief Executive Officer and Zohar Hyblum served as the Chief Financial Officer; both were part of Momentum Venture Management founders.

During the years Celtro has raised ~$40 million in four founding rounds from investors like Rho Capital Partners, Momentum Venture Management, Genesis partners, Kreos capital, Cedar fund and ECI Telecom.

In July 2010, Eran Dariel replaced Roni Tzur as the Chief Executive Officer and President of Celtro Ltd. At that time, Joshua Di-Nur was serving as the company Chief Financial Officer and Dr. Shahar Gorodeisky was the Chief Technical Officer.

In March 2012 Celtro Ltd. went into liquidation process; the company was offered for sale to the highest bidder. In June 2012, Celtro Ltd. was acquired by Septier Communication and renamed Celtro Communication Ltd. The new company, with Yaron Baratz as president and Eli Shubi as the Chief Operation Officer, decided to continue the support of Celtro's Ltd. customers worldwide and to continue the focus on cellular backhaul compression solutions.  The company holds a few pending technology patents enabling compression of All-IP RAN technologies including LTE.

Technology
Celtro offers technology for mobile operators worldwide, in order to assist service delivery and network efficiency. These technologies operate within the cellular backhaul using a lossless data compression algorithm for 2G/3G/LTE internet protocol (IP) traffic. They have also developed a forward error correction (FEC) mechanism, which they claim improves the transmission bit error rate/framing error ratio.

References

External links
Celtro's website

Companies based in Petah Tikva
Telecommunications companies of Israel
Telecommunications companies established in 2001